Tao is a metaphysical concept found in Taoism, Confucianism, and more generally in ancient Chinese philosophy.

Tao may also refer to:

Comics and video games 
 Tao (comics), the fictional character from the comic book WildCATS
 Tao Jun, the fictional female character from the manga and anime Shaman King
 Tao Pai Pai, the fictional character in Dragon Ball media
 Tao Ren, the fictional male character from the manga and anime Shaman King
 Tao (video game), a post-industrial video game for the Famicom

Geography
 Tao (historical region), part of the Georgian Tao-Klarjeti principalities
 Tao, Mali, a commune in the Cercle of Koutiala, Mali
 Tao River, a tributary of the Yellow River in Gansu Province, China
 Ko Tao, an island in the Gulf of Thailand
 Tao, Senegal, a village in Senegal
 TAO, Qingdao Jiaodong International Airport, by IATA airport code

People and language
 Tao people, also known as the Yami, a Taiwanese aboriginal peoples, native to outlying Orchid Island
 Tao, Yami language, by ISO 639-3 code

Medicine 
 Thromboangiitis obliterans, Buerger's disease, a type of vasculitis
 Thyroid-associated orbitopathy, an autoimmune inflammatory disorder of the orbit and periorbital tissues
 Troleandomycin, an antibiotic

Music
 Taos, country rock band of the 1970s
 Tao (album), an album by Rick Springfield
 T.A.O (EP), by Z.Tao
 Tao (musical troupe), a Japanese drum and dance ensemble
 TAO (song), a single by Do As Infinity
 TAO, Together as One (festival), a large rave held New Year's Eve in Los Angeles

Organisations
TAO, Tailored Access Operations, a cyber espionage unit within the United States National Security Agency
Tao Group, a software company headquartered in Reading, Berkshire, United Kingdom
TAO (collective), a radical tech organization based in Canada

People
 Tao (surname), Chinese surname
 Tào (surname), the Vietnamese surname based on the Chinese surname Cao
 Terence Tao, Australian-American mathematician, co-recipient of the 2006 Fields Medal
 Seqenenre Tao, Egyptian ruler of Thebes who started the process of ousting the Hyksos kings from Egypt
 Tao Geoghegan Hart, British cyclist
 Tao Okamoto, Japanese model and actress
 Tao Tsuchiya, Japanese actress
 Huang Zitao, Chinese rapper, actor and martial artist
 Antwuan "Tao" Simpson, American singer of Dru Hill band

Science and technology
 Tao, Motorola Droid, an Android smartphone, by codename
 Tao Framework, a library giving .NET and mono developers access to popular graphics and gaming libraries like OpenGL and SDL
 TAO, Tamke-Allan Observatory, in Tennessee, United States
 TAO (e-Testing platform), Testing Assisté par Ordinateur (Computer Based Testing), open source software
 TAO (software), The ACE ORB, open source software
 TAO, Ten Acre Observatory, in Oklahoma, United States
 TAO, Tropical Atmosphere Ocean project, a project to map the tropical Pacific Ocean
 TAO, Track At Once, an optical disc recording mode
 TAO, tactical action officer, in the U.S. Navy, see Operations specialist (United States Navy)

See also
 Taos (disambiguation)

Japanese feminine given names